Assembly of God Bethlehem Ministry also has Churches in other parts of the United States and other countries in the world. Serving in different languages too. Here are all of the Congregations:

External links
  (Assembly of God Bethlehem Ministry Official Page)

References

Assemblies of God